Pierre Lagacé (born October 27, 1957) is a former professional ice hockey centre. He was drafted by the Quebec Nordiques in the eighth round, 73rd overall, of the 1977 WHA Amateur Draft.  He was also drafted by the Montreal Canadiens of the National Hockey League yet never played in that league.

He played 38 regular-season games in the World Hockey Association with the Nordiques in the 1977–78 and 1978–79 seasons.

Lagace currently resides in Erie, Pennsylvania and owns Pano's restaurants.

References

External links

1957 births
Living people
Baltimore Clippers (1979–81) players
Binghamton Dusters players
Canadian ice hockey centres
Erie Golden Blades players
French Quebecers
Hampton Gulls (AHL) players
Montreal Canadiens draft picks
Nashville South Stars (ACHL) players
Quebec Nordiques (WHA) draft picks
Quebec Nordiques (WHA) players
Quebec Remparts players
Salem Raiders players
Ice hockey people from Montreal
Trois-Rivières Draveurs players
Virginia Lancers (ACHL) players